Remy or Rémy may refer to:

Places 
 Remy River, a tributary of rivière du Gouffre in Saint-Urbain, Quebec, Canada
 Rémy, Pas-de-Calais, a French commune in Pas-de-Calais
 Remy, Oise, northern France
 Remy, Oklahoma, United States
 14683 Remy, an asteroid
 Pont-Remy, a French commune in Picardie
 Saint-Rémy (disambiguation), the name of numerous French communes

People 
 Rémy (name)
 Rémy (rapper), French rapper

Brands and enterprises
 Remy Bumppo Theatre Company
 Rémy Cointreau, a French drinks conglomerate
 Rémy Martin, a brandy they produce
 Remy International, an electrical systems company

Music
 Remy Zero, a musical group
 Remy Zero (album), 1996 self-titled album

Other uses
 Remy, a type of artificial hair
 Remy Grand Brassard and Trophy Race, an automobile race sponsored by Remy Electric

See also
 Remi (disambiguation)
 Remigius (disambiguation)